Longanalus macrochirous is a species of cave-dwelling cyprinid fish endemic to the Maolan National Reserve in Guizhou, China.  It is the only member of its genus.

References
 

Fish described in 2006
Cyprinid fish of Asia
Freshwater fish of China
Endemic fauna of China
Cave fish
Labeoninae